The snooker world rankings are the official system of ranking professional snooker players to determine automatic qualification and seeding for tournaments on the World Snooker Tour. The ranking lists are maintained by the sport's governing body, the World Professional Billiards and Snooker Association. Each player's world ranking is based on their performances in designated ranking tournaments over the preceding two years, and it is updated after every ranking tournament. The world rankings were inaugurated in the 1976–77 season with the point tariffs set by the governing body, but transitioned to a prize money list in the 2014–15 season.

Background 
The rankings determine the seedings for tournaments on the World Snooker Tour, organised by the World Professional Billiards and Snooker Association (WPBSA), and who gets an invite to prestigious invitational events. Tournaments open to the membership are often played in two stages—a qualification stage and the "venue stage"—usually at different locations. In tournaments with a "tiered" format players come into events in different rounds based on their ranking, and in some cases the top players in the sport are seeded through to the venue stage and do not have to play a qualification match. In particular, the top 16 ranked players automatically qualify for the final stages of the World Championship and the Masters, so as well as interest in who will be number one, there is typically a lot of interest in which players are likely to maintain or acquire "top 16 status". Players are awarded ranking points according to the round they reach in ranking tournaments—specially designated tournaments that carry ranking status. Every professional member of the WPBSA is assigned a ranking, whether they are active on the circuit or not.

System 
Prior to the introduction of the world rankings, the previous year's winner and runner-up were allocated the top seedings in the World Championship, held annually. As more tournaments were added to the calendar and more players joined the circuit in the 1970s, it became increasingly necessary to seed the tournaments, precipitating the "Order of Merit" for the 1975–76 season. The system was very basic, with seedings based on the results of the last three World Championships, and rankings were formally introduced in 1976 after the World Championship for the 1976–77 season using the same criteria. By the 1982–83 season many more tournaments were being contested, and it seemed reasonable to take those results into consideration too. The Professional Players Tournament and International Open were awarded ranking status, working on the same system; the Classic carried ranking points from the 1983–84 season, the UK Championship and British Open from 1984–85. The revised system was now based on only the two previous seasons, and updated annually after the World Championship. While the ranking point allocations have undergone modifications down the years the basic system remained the same up until the 2009–10 season. For the 2010–11 season, the system was revised to incorporate ranking updates after every tournament—instead of once a season—in an effort to make the rankings more reflective of current form. The current system utilises a two-year "rolling" format where points from tournaments in the current season replace the points from corresponding tournaments of two seasons ago.

Seedings 
The seedings for tournaments change from tournament to tournament: the defending champion is allocated the top seed followed by the reigning world champion and the remaining seeds are taken from a "seeding list". When the official rankings were only calculated once a year the seedings for tournaments—with the exception of the top two seeds—followed the official rankings. Players and pundits closely tracked the ranking points earned during a season; the "provisional rankings" (which had no official status in the game) were the rankings based on the ranking points accumulated in the previous season, combined with those accumulated thus far in the current season, and as the season progressed they converged on the official rankings for the following season. The provisional rankings gave an indication of a player's form, and as the season approached its dénouement, the provisional rankings would become a source of tension as the battle for the number one spot, top 16 places, and tour qualification intensified. The introduction of the rolling rankings in 2010 facilitated updates to the seeding list throughout the season. Various "cut-off" points are selected at convenient stages during the season where the rankings are "frozen" and used as seedings for the next few tournaments, until the next revision.

Tariffs 
The original "Order of Merit", created for the 1975–76 season and based on just World Championship results, awarded the winner five points, the runner-up four, semi-finalists three, and so on down to one point for players who lost in the last 16. The world rankings, introduced in the following year, used the same allocation. Subsequent tournaments that were assigned ranking status worked on the same system but with the World Championship from 1983 onwards carrying double points. The ranking point allocation was later revised slightly with winners of all bar the World Championship now receiving six points, runners-up five, down to one point for the last 32; the World Championship more or less stayed as it was with ten points for the winner, incrementally reduced by two points for each preceding round, but now awarded one point for the last 32 in line with the other tournaments. In addition to ranking points, merit and frame points were also awarded which were used as a tie-break when players were on equal ranking points. When the game went open for the 1991–92 season, the ranking point allocations (devised by the WPBSA chairman on the back of a cigarette pack) were altered by several factors to accommodate the influx of new players. The tie-break system was dropped but the system remained basically the same with players awarded incrementally more points for each successive round; should a seeded player lose their first match they would receive only half the points allocated to the non-seeded losers in that round. The World Championship continued to award more points than the other events but under the "open era" system the allocations often varied between other events too, with the UK Championship traditionally having the second-highest tariff. The ranking point schedule was replaced by a prize money list for the 2014–15 season, with prize money earnings in events carrying ranking status contributing to a players ranking.

Prize money rankings schedule

References

External links
 World Rankings at World Snooker